Dawid Henryk Podsiadło (born 23 May 1993) is a Polish singer-songwriter who won the second series of X Factor in 2012. He received PLN 100,000 and a recording contract with Sony Music. On the show, he was mentored by Tatiana Okupnik.

His debut album titled Comfort and Happiness was released on 28 May 2013. It debuted at number one on the Polish Albums Chart and was certified triple Platinum the same year, becoming the best-selling album of 2013 in Poland. The album received Diamond certification in 2015.

In October 2014, Podsiadło released an album with his band Curly Heads. The album, titled Ruby Dress Skinny Dog and produced by Daniel Walczak, debuted at number four on the Polish Albums Chart and was certified Gold.
The album was nominated for the 2015 Fryderyk award in the Rock Album of the Year category.

Podsiadło's second solo album, Annoyance and Disappointment, was released on 6 November 2015. The album debuted at number one in Poland and was certified Diamond.

Discography

Studio albums

Reissues

Live albums

Extended plays

Singles

As featured artist

Promotional singles

Other charted and certified songs

Guest appearances

References

1993 births
Living people
The X Factor winners
Polish pop singers
Polish rock singers
English-language singers from Poland
21st-century Polish male singers
21st-century Polish singers
People from Dąbrowa Górnicza